Hamdi Aslan (born 6 September 1967) is a Turkish football coach and former footballer. Between 2006 and 2010, he served as the head coach of the Turkey women's national team.

Club career
Aslan began his playing career at his local club Trabzonspor's youth team. Between 1990 and 1996, he played in the senior team, the first season in the |TFF First League, and then in the Süper Lig. During this time, he capped 156 times and scored 16 goals in the league matches, and enjoyed three Turkish Cup, two President's Cup and three Prime Minister's Cup titles with his club. In the 1996–97 season, Aslan transferred to the TFF Second League club Adanaspor, where he appeared in 88 matches and netted 23 goals in total.

Aslan is remembered for his fair play and his head goals for Trabzonspor.

International career
Aslan was admitted to the Turkey U-18 team, and debuted in the 1986 UEFA European Under-18 Championship qualifying – Group 8 match against the Czech team on 18 April 1985. Aslan took part in three of the six matches at the tournament. He capped 9 times for the Turkey youth team.

His first appearance in the Turkey U-21 was in the friendly match against Romanian juniors on 3 March 1987. He played in one of the four matches at the 1988 UEFA European Under-21 Championship – Qualifying Stage Group 4, and in five of the six matches at the 1990 UEFA European Under-21 Championship – Qualifying Stage Group 3. Aslan capped nine times for the Turkey U-21 team.

He was seven times part of the Turkey national football team, six of them at the 1987 Mediterranean Cup.

Managerial career
Hamdi Aslan managed the team Akçaabat Sebatspor in his hometown in the 2005–06 season, before he was appointed head coach of the Turkey women's national team in 2006. Coaching also the women's junior and girls' youth teams, he served at this position until 2010.

Career statistics

Honours
Trabzonspor
Turkish Cup: 1991–92, 1994–95

References

Living people
1967 births
People from Akçaabat
Turkish footballers
Association football defenders
Turkey under-21 international footballers
Turkey youth international footballers
Olympic footballers of Turkey
Süper Lig players
Trabzonspor footballers
Adanaspor footballers
Turkish football managers
Akçaabat Sebatspor managers
Turkey women's national football team managers
Mediterranean Games bronze medalists for Turkey
Mediterranean Games medalists in football
Competitors at the 1987 Mediterranean Games